Caudella is a genus of fungi in the Microthyriaceae family.

Species
As accepted by Species Fungorum;
 Caudella bipolaris 
 Caudella gordoniae 
 Caudella oligotricha 
 Caudella psidii

References

External links
Index Fungorum

Microthyriales